The Scotland women's national under-18 basketball team is a national basketball team of Scotland, administered by the Basketballscotland. It represents the country in women's international under-18 basketball competitions.

The team finished 11th at the 1971 FIBA European Championship for Junior Women. They also participated at several FIBA U18 Women's European Championship Division B tournaments and they won three gold medals at the FIBA U18 Women's European Championship Division C.

See also
Scotland women's national basketball team
Scotland women's national under-16 basketball team
Scotland men's national under-18 basketball team

References

External links
Archived records of Scotland team participations

Basketball in Scotland
Women's national under-18 basketball teams
Basketball